Philippe Lauraire (born 14 July 1961) is a French former professional racing cyclist. He rode the 1985 Tour de France.

References

External links
 

1961 births
Living people
French male cyclists
Sportspeople from Yvelines
Cyclists from Île-de-France